Gubernatorial elections in 1994 took place in six regions of the Russian Federation. Chairmen of the Supreme Soviets of the four autonomous republics were elected presidents that year continuing the process of disbanding of the Soviets system, which began with dispersal of the Supreme Soviet of Russia in October 1993.

Race summary

References

Gubernatorial elections in Russia
1994 elections in Russia